This is a list of electoral results for the electoral district of Gibson in South Australian state elections.

Members for Gibson

Election results

Elections in the 2020s

Elections in the 2010s

References

South Australian state electoral results by district